This is a list of death metal bands (listed by letters L through Z). It includes bands that have at some stage in their career played within the style of death metal, or one of its sub- or fusion genres; as such there will inevitably be a certain amount of overlap with the list of melodic death metal bands, the list of Swedish death metal bands, and others. 

The remaining list can be found at List of death metal bands, !–K.

List

L

 Lamb of God
 Legion of the Damned
 Leng Tch'e
 Liers in Wait
 Living Sacrifice
 Lock Up
 Lost Soul
 Loudblast
 Lyzanxia

M

 Macabre
 Malefice
 Malignancy
 Malevolent Creation
 Manimal
 Marionette
 Martyr
 Massacra
 Massacre
 Master
 Mendeed
 Mental Horror
 Mercenary
 Merlin
 Meshuggah
 Messiah
 Misanthrope
 Miseration
 Misery
 Misery Index
 Mistress
 Mnemic
 Molotov Solution
 Monstrosity
 Morbid Angel
 Morgion
 Morgoth
 Morphia
 Mors Principium Est
 Mortem
 Mortician
 Mortification
 Murder Squad
 My Dying Bride
 Mygrain
 Myrkskog

N

 Nahemah
 Napalm Death
 Nasum
 Neaera
 Necare
 Necrophagia
 Necrophagist
 Necrophobic
 Nefastus Dies
 Nefilim
 Nembrionic
 Neptune
 Neuraxis
 Nightfall
 Nightrage
 Nights Like These
 Nihilist
 Nile
 Nocturnus
 Nonexist
 Norther
 Noumena
 Novembers Doom
 Novembre
 Nuclear Death

O

 Obituary
 Obliterate
 Obscene Eulogy
 Obscura
 Oceano
 October Tide
 Odious Mortem
 Old Man's Child
 Omnium Gatherum
 On Thorns I Lay
 One Man Army and the Undead Quartet
 Opeth
 Ophiolatry
 Oppressor
 Opprobrium
 Order from Chaos
 Origin
 Orphaned Land

P

 Paganizer
 Panzerchrist
 Paradise Lost
 Paths of Possession
Persefone
 Pavor
 Pestilence
 Pig Destroyer
 Pissgrave
 Portal
 Possessed
 The Project Hate MCMXCIX
 Psycroptic
 Pungent Stench
 Pyogenesis
 Pyrrhon

Q

 Quo Vadis

R

 Raise Hell
 Raintime
 Rapture
 Raunchy
 Rebaelliun
 The Red Chord	
 The Red Death
 The Red Shore
 Regurgitate
 Renascent 
 Resurrection
 Revocation
 Ribspreader
 Ripping Corpse
 The Rotted
 Rotten Sound
 Rudra
 The Ruins of Beverast
 Runemagick

S

 Sacrificium
 Sadist
 Sadistic Intent
 Sadistik Exekution
 Sadus
 Salt the Wound
 Sarcófago
 Satariel
 Saturnus
 Scar Symmetry
 Scarve
 Schaliach
 Sceptic
 Sculptured
 Seance
 Sentenced
 Septicflesh
 Sepultura
 Severe Torture
 Shadows Fall
 The Showdown 
 Sinate
 Sinister
 Six Feet Under
 Skinless
 Skyfire
 Slaughter
 Soilent Green
 Soilwork
 Solamors
 Solution .45
 Sonic Syndicate
 Sons of Azrael
 Sotajumala
 Soul Demise
 Soul Embraced
 Soulburn
 Soulfly
 Spawn of Possession
 Stovokor
 Strapping Young Lad
 Success Will Write Apocalypse Across the Sky
 Suffocation
 Susperia
 Swallow the Sun
 Switchblade
 Sylosis
 Sympathy
 Symphony of Heaven

T

 Terror 2000
 Terrorizer
 Terrorust
 Thanatos
 Theory in Practice
 Therion
 Thirdmoon
 This Ending
 Thorr's Hammer  	
 Threat Signal
 Through the Eyes of the Dead
 Thy Disease
 Tiamat
 Torture Killer
 Torture Squad
 Tourniquet
 Trap Them
 Tristwood

U

 Ulcerate
 Umbra Vitae
 Unanimated
 Underoath
 Unholy
 Unleashed

V

 Vader
 Vastum
 Venom Prison
 Vile
 Visceral Bleeding
 Vital Remains
 Vomitory
 Vorkreist

W

 Waltari
 Wayd
 Winter
 With Blood Comes Cleansing

X
 
 Xenomorph
 Xysma

Y

 Yyrkoon

Z

 Zao
 Zonaria
 Zyklon

See also

 List of melodic death metal bands
 List of heavy metal bands
 List of grindcore bands

References

Lists of death metal bands

es:Anexo:Bandas de death metal
ms:Senarai band death metal
pt:Anexo:Lista de bandas de death metal
ro:Listă de formații death metal
ru:Список исполнителей дэт-метала
fi:Luettelo death metal -yhtyeistä